Villerville is a commune in the Calvados department in the Normandy region in northwestern France. the commune is located towards the eastern end of the  coastline called the Côte Fleurie (Flowery Coast).

Composer Francis Bayer (1938–2004) was born in Villerville.

Population

International relations
Villerville is twinned with:
Hausen bei Würzburg (in Bavaria, Germany)

See also
Communes of the Calvados department

References

External links

Official site 
Extraordinary history of the theatre inside a whale, at Villerville

Communes of Calvados (department)
Seaside resorts in France
Calvados communes articles needing translation from French Wikipedia